Seok Jung-Ah  (born ) is a retired South Korean volleyball player. She was part of the South Korea women's national volleyball team.

She participated in the 1994 FIVB Volleyball Women's World Championship. On club level she played with Fuji Film.

Clubs
 Fuji Film (1994)

References

1971 births
Living people
South Korean women's volleyball players
Place of birth missing (living people)